The Women's ski big air competition at the FIS Freestyle Ski and Snowboarding World Championships 2023 was held on 3 and 4 March 2023.

Qualification
The qualification was started on 3 March at 16:20. The eight best skiers qualified for the final.

Final
The final was started on 4 March at 15:15.

References

Women's ski big air